Ariel Heryanto is an Indonesian humanities scholar whose main areas of interest are cultural studies, media studies, and postcolonial studies. He is currently the Herb Feith Professor for the Study of Indonesia at Monash University, Australia and the deputy director of the Monash Asia Institute.He previously served as the head of the Southeast Asia Centre in the Faculty of Asian Studies at the Australia National University. He also had several lecturer positions at different universities, such as senior lecturer and head of the Indonesian Studies Program at the University of Melbourne, senior lecturer at the National University of Singapore, and postgraduate lecturer at Universitas Kristen Satya Wacana, Salatiga, Indonesia. His bachelor's degree is from Universitas Kristen Satya Wacana while his MA is in Asian studies from the University of Michigan, United States, and his PhD degree is in cultural anthropology from Monash, University.

Publications
 "Identity and Pleasure; the politics of Indonesian screen culture". Singapore: NUS Press (2014)
 "State Terrorism and Political Identity in Indonesia: Fatally Belonging". London: Routledge (2007), 
 "Popular Culture in Indonesia: Fluid Identities in Post-Authoritarian Politics". London & New York: Routledge (2008), as editor.
 "Pop Culture Formations Across East Asia". Seoul: Jimoondang (2010), as co-editor.

References

External links
Open Access Archive of writings by Ariel Heryanto

Date of birth missing (living people)
Living people
University of Michigan alumni
Year of birth missing (living people)